Calathea picturata is a species of plant in the family Marantaceae, native to northwest Brazil. The leaves are dark green above, purple below, marked heavily with silver along the veins and midriff. It is tender, with a minimum temperature of  required, and in temperate areas is cultivated indoors as a houseplant.

Under the synonym Goeppertia picturata the cultivar 'Argentea', with silver leaves edged in green, has gained the Royal Horticultural Society's Award of Garden Merit.

References

Flora of Brazil
picturata
House plants
Plants described in 1863